KICA-FM (98.3 FM, "La Caliente 98.3") is a radio station broadcasting a Regional Mexican format. Licensed to Farwell, Texas, United States, and serving the Clovis NM market, the station is currently owned by HPRN Networks, LLP.

KICA-FM has been silent since May 30, 2020, due to transmitter site damage caused by lightning.

History
The station went on the air as KLZK on September 15, 1984. On June 14, 1991, the station changed its call sign to the current KICA-FM.

After KLZK went off the air, the station was re-launched in 1991 under the KICA-FM call letters under the moniker of K-Classic 98.3; initially operating out of studios in Muleshoe, TX, where it was co-located with Southwestern Entertainment Group sister stations KMUL-AM/FM.  The original on-air lineup was Ray Don Stanton (who also doubled as KMUL's morning man), former KZZO-FM jock Bryan Daniels and night guy Jeff Gardner.  By 1992, the station had moved to studios at 1000 Sycamore, across from Hillcrest Park, in Clovis.  That site also became the home to Spanish KICA-AM (Radio KICA), and eventually Country KKYC-FM 102.3, which simulcast with KMUL-FM 103.1.  The station group would be eventually sold to Tallgrass Broadcasting, which would later go into receivership and take the stations dark.   

Years later, the aired a rock format as K98 and a contemporary hit radio format as "Fun 98.3".

References

External links

ICA-FM
1984 establishments in Texas
Radio stations established in 1984
Parmer County, Texas